Wachovia is a bank and a subsidiary of Wells Fargo.

Wachovia or Wachovia Building may also refer to:

Locations 
Wachovia, North Carolina, an area in Forsyth County, North Carolina
the Latin name for the Wachau in Austria

Buildings 

Wachovia Tower (Birmingham), an office building in Birmingham, Alabama
Wachovia Building (Mobile), Alabama
Wachovia Tower, now One Enterprise Center, in Jacksonville, Florida
Wachovia Financial Center, previous name of a skyscraper in Miami, Florida
Wachovia Bank of Georgia, a skyscraper in Atlanta, Georgia
Wells Fargo Tower (Baltimore), Maryland, formerly known as the Wachovia Tower
One Wells Fargo Center, in Charlotte, North Carolina, formerly known as One Wachovia Center
Two Wells Fargo Center, in Charlotte, formerly known as Two Wachovia Center
Three Wells Fargo Center, in Charlotte, formerly known as Three Wachovia Center
Duke Energy Center, in Charlotte, formerly known as Wachovia Corporate Center
100 North Main Street, in Winston-Salem, North Carolina, formerly known as Wachovia Center
Winston Tower, formerly known as Wachovia Building, in Winston-Salem, North Carolina, listed on the NRHP
Wachovia Bank and Trust Company Building, Winston-Salem, North Carolina, listed on the NRHP
Wachovia Building (Philadelphia), a skyscraper in Philadelphia, Pennsylvania

Sports Arenas 
Wachovia Arena at Casey Plaza, 8,300-seat multi-purpose arena located in Wilkes-Barre, Pennsylvania
Wachovia Center, indoor arena located in Philadelphia, Pennsylvania
Wachovia Spectrum, indoor arena that was replaced by the Wachovia Center

Other 
Wachovia Championship, PGA Golf Tournament
Wachovia Securities, brokerage division of Wachovia